The 1984 NFL season was the 65th regular season of the National Football League. The Colts relocated from Baltimore, Maryland to Indianapolis, Indiana before the season.

The season ended with Super Bowl XIX when the San Francisco 49ers defeated the Miami Dolphins 38–16 at Stanford Stadium in California. This was the first Super Bowl televised by ABC, who entered into the annual championship game rotation with CBS and NBC. This game marked the second shortest distance between the Super Bowl host stadium (Stanford, California) and a Super Bowl team (San Francisco 49ers).

The 49ers became the first team in NFL history to win 15 games in a regular season and to win 18 in an entire season (including the postseason). Additionally, two major offensive records were set this season, with quarterback Dan Marino establishing a new single-season passing yards record with 5,084 (later broken by Drew Brees in 2011, 2012, 2013 and 2016, by Tom Brady in 2011, by Peyton Manning in 2013, by Ben Roethlisberger and Patrick Mahomes in 2018 and by  Jameis Winston in 2019) and Eric Dickerson establishing a new single-season rushing yards record with 2,105. Another statistical record broken was Mark Gastineau for most sacks in a single season, with 22 (surpassed by Michael Strahan in 2001).

Also during the season, San Diego Chargers wide receiver Charlie Joiner became the all-time leader in career receptions; he set that mark in a game between the Chargers and the Pittsburgh Steelers at Pittsburgh's Three Rivers Stadium.

In a week 10 game against the Kansas City Chiefs, the Seattle Seahawks set numerous NFL records for interception returns, including most interception return yardage in a game and most interceptions returned for touchdowns in a game with 4 (all touchdowns over 50 yards in length). The Seahawks also tied an NFL record with 63 defensive takeaways on the season.

Salaries increased significantly over the past two seasons in the NFL, up nearly fifty percent; new Houston Oilers quarterback Warren Moon led the list at $1.1 million.

Player movement

Transactions
February 4, 1984: Warren Moon signs a contract with the Houston Oilers.

Trades
 February 23, 1984: The Pittsburgh Steelers acquire David Woodley in a trade with the Miami Dolphins. 
 October 10, 1984: The Houston Oilers traded running back Earl Campbell to the New Orleans Saints in exchange for their top choice in the 1985 NFL draft.

Retirements
July 24, 1984: Four-time Super Bowl champion Terry Bradshaw announces his retirement.

Draft
The 1984 NFL draft was held from May 1 to May 2, 1984 at New York City's Omni Park Central Hotel. With the first pick, the New England Patriots selected wide receiver Irving Fryar from the University of Nebraska.

Supplemental draft of USFL and CFL players

In an attempt to head off a bidding war within its own ranks for United States Football League and Canadian Football League  players, a one-time supplemental draft of USFL and CFL players was held on June 5, 1984. This supplemental draft was especially designed for players who would have been eligible for the regular NFL draft but had already signed a contract with a USFL team after being selected in 1984 USFL Draft earlier on January 4. NFL owners did not want to risk potentially "wasting" picks in the regular draft on players who were already signed by another league, but also wanted to ensure there would not be a large influx of free agent talent in case the new rival league suddenly collapsed. With the first pick, the Tampa Bay Buccaneers selected quarterback Steve Young from BYU, who previously was selected by the Los Angeles Express with the 11th pick in the USFL Draft. Young would eventually join the Buccaneers in summer 1985 soon after the Express suspended operations.

Major rule changes
The league's jersey numbering system was modified to allow linebackers to wear numbers 90 to 99, in addition to 50 to 59.
The penalty for a kickoff or onside kick that goes out of bounds is 5 yards from the previous spot and a re-kick must be made. However, if the second (or more) kickoff or onside kick goes out of bounds, the receiving team may choose instead to take possession of the ball at the out of bounds spot.
Leaping to try to block a field goal or an extra point is illegal unless the defensive player was lined up at the line of scrimmage.
A kicker or holder who fakes being roughed or run into by a defensive player can receive an unsportsmanlike conduct penalty.
Unsportsmanlike conduct will also be called for any prolonged, excessive, or premeditated celebration by individual players or a group of players. This is usually referred to as the “Mark Gastineau Rule” because a major reason why this change was made was to stop him from performing his signature “Sack Dance” every time after he sacked an opposing quarterback. This also referred to the Washington Redskins "Fun Bunch".

1984 deaths
David Overstreet was killed in a car accident on June 24, 1984. He was driving northbound in his 1980 Mercedes on Texas State Highway 155, when his car swerved off the road about 10 miles northeast of Tyler into gasoline pumps at a service station and exploded.  The Dolphins wore a helmet decal with the number 20 in his memory during their 1984 season in which they reached Super Bowl XIX.
This was the third offseason in four years in which an active Dolphins player died. Linebacker Rusty Chambers was killed in a July 1981 automobile accident, and linebacker Larry Gordon died of a heart attack while jogging in June 1983.
Ricky Bell Passed away November 28, 1984 at the age of 29 due to complications caused by dermatomyositis. Bell was the first overall selection in the 1977 draft by the Tampa Bay Buccaneers following an All-America career at USC. Bell played for coach John McKay at USC and Tampa Bay.

Preseason
The Pro Football Hall of Fame Game, in which the Seattle Seahawks defeated the Tampa Bay Buccaneers 38–0, was contested on July 28, 1984 and held at Fawcett Stadium in Canton, Ohio, the same city where the league was founded. The 1984 Hall of Fame Class included Willie Brown, Mike McCormack, Charley Taylor and Arnie Weinmeister.

Regular season

Scheduling formula

Highlights of the 1984 season included:
Thanksgiving: Two games were played on Thursday, November 22, featuring Green Bay at Detroit and New England at Dallas, with Detroit and Dallas winning.

Final standings

Tiebreakers
N.Y. Giants finished ahead of St. Louis and Dallas in the NFC East based on best head-to-head record (3–1 to Cardinals’ 2–2 and Cowboys’ 1–3).
St. Louis finished ahead of Dallas in the NFC East based on better division record (5–3 to Cowboys’ 3–5).

Playoffs

Notable events
September 30, 1984: The Colts won their first game ever at Indianapolis during a Week 5 contest against AFC East opponent, the Buffalo Bills, winning by a 31–17 margin.

 For the only time in NFL history, two teams – the Oilers and the Bills – begin the season 0–10.

Milestones

The following players set all-time records during the season:

Statistical leaders

Team

Awards

Coaching changes

Offseason
Cincinnati Bengals: Sam Wyche replaced the resigning Forrest Gregg, who left to join the Green Bay Packers.
Green Bay Packers: Bart Starr was fired. Forrest Gregg then joined the Packers after resigning from the Bengals.
Houston Oilers: Hugh Campbell was hired as head coach. Ed Biles was fired after the team lost their first six games in 1983. Defensive coordinator Chuck Studley took over as interim.
Minnesota Vikings: Les Steckel replaced the retiring Bud Grant.

In-season
Cleveland Browns: Sam Rutigliano was fired after starting the season 1–7, and was replaced by defensive coordinator Marty Schottenheimer.
Indianapolis Colts: Frank Kush resigned after the team went 4–11. Offensive line coach Hal Hunter served as interim for the team's final regular season game.
New England Patriots: Ron Meyer was fired after eight games, despite a 5–3 record, due to his team-wide alienation of players. Raymond Berry, who had been out of coaching since serving as New England's receivers coach from 1978 to 1981, was named has Meyer's replacement.

Stadium changes
The relocated Indianapolis Colts moved from Baltimore's Memorial Stadium to the Hoosier Dome in Indianapolis.

The New York Jets moved their home games from Shea Stadium in New York City to Giants Stadium in East Rutherford, New Jersey, sharing it with the Giants.

Uniform changes
 The Atlanta Falcons switched from white to black face masks.
 The Buffalo Bills switched from white helmets to red, primarily to help quarterback Joe Ferguson distinguish his teammates from the white helmets also worn by AFC East rivals Baltimore Colts, Miami Dolphins, and New England Patriots.
 The Chicago Bears permanently added "GSH" to the left sleeve of the jerseys, in memory of longtime owner and coach George Halas. The Bears also added navy blue pants to wear with their white jerseys. 
 The Cleveland Browns added new striping patterns to their brown and white jerseys, and white pants. Outlines were also added to the numbers. During the preseason, the numbers on the brown jerseys were orange trimmed with white; however, complaints about the numbers being too difficult to read prompted the color scheme to be reversed for the regular season. They also stopped using orange pants and instead wore white pants with both the brown and white jerseys. Brown-topped socks were worn with the brown jerseys, and orange-topped socks were worn with the white jerseys. 
 The Detroit Lions switched from gray to blue face masks.
 The Green Bay Packers added player numbers to their pants at the hip, similar to the Dallas Cowboys. The "TV numbers" on the jerseys were moved from the sleeves to the shoulders, and the "G" monogram on the helmets was repeated on the jersey sleeves. 
 The New England Patriots made major changes to their jerseys, adding "UCLA stripes" around the shoulders, replacing the two stripes at the bottom of the sleeves which were used from 1973-83. The Patriots also returned to wearing red pants with their white jerseys as they did in 1979 and '80. These uniforms remained largely unchanged through 1992, except for a change to red facemasks in 1991 and the discontinuation of the red pants in 1988 and '89.

Television
This was the third year under the league's five-year broadcast contracts with ABC, CBS, and NBC to televise Monday Night Football, the NFC package, and the AFC package, respectively. Howard Cosell left MNF, primarily due to the fallout of his offhand remarks about wide receiver Alvin Garrett during a 1983 broadcast that was viewed as racially insensitive. O. J. Simpson was then promoted from fill-in to full-time color commentator, joining Frank Gifford and Don Meredith in the booth. On NBC's pregame show NFL '84, Bob Costas replaced Len Berman as host. This was the last season that Phyllis George served on The NFL Today.

Regular season games not broadcast by Network TV

References

NFL Record and Fact Book
NFL History 1981–1990 (Last accessed December 4, 2005)
Total Football: The Official Encyclopedia of the National Football League

National Football League seasons
National Football League